Summerland is an American drama television series created by Stephen Tolkin and Lori Loughlin. It is centered on a clothing designer in her 30s, Ava Gregory (Loughlin), raising her niece and nephews after their parents die in a tragic accident. They live with three of Ava's friends who also help raise the kids in the fictional city of Playa Linda, California.

Summerland premiered on June 1, 2004, on The WB (now CW). The series ran for a total of 26 episodes over two seasons. Its cancellation was announced on May 15, 2005, and the last episode aired on July 18, 2005. A soundtrack was released on March 19, 2005, and the show has been syndicated in many countries.

Synopsis

Overview
The series follows Ava Gregory (Lori Loughlin), a fashion designer, and her housemates and niece and nephews as they learn to cope with a life-changing event and each other. After the death of their parents, Bradin (Jesse McCartney), Nikki (Kay Panabaker), and Derrick Westerly (Nick Benson) leave their home in Kansas to live with their Aunt Ava in Playa Linda, California. They live with three other house mates: Johnny Durant (Shawn Christian), Ava's ex-boyfriend; Susannah Rexford (Merrin Dungey), Ava's best friend and business partner; and Jay Robertson (Ryan Kwanten), an Australian surfer who owns a local surf shop. The show follows the struggles that these friends and family face as they adapt to their new lives together. Jay has an on-again-off-again relationship with Erika Spalding (Taylor Cole), who becomes Bradin's surfing instructor. Cameron Bale (Zac Efron) is Nikki's boyfriend and classmate.

Cast and characters

Main
Summerland initially featured a main cast of eight characters. In the second season, after appearing as a recurring member in the first season, Zac Efron was added to the main cast. This brought the total number of main characters to nine.
 Ava Gregory (Lori Loughlin) is a woman in her mid 30s who is raising her niece and nephews, Bradin, Nikki, and Derrick Westerly, after their parents' tragic deaths. She lives in a beach house with the children, her on again/off again boyfriend Johnny, her best friend Susannah, and another close friend, Jay. Ava has a very hectic life and also faces the stressful task of raising three children, who are all devastated at the loss of their parents and who deal with their loss in very different ways.
 Johnny Durant (Shawn Christian) is Ava's ex-boyfriend who still remains her roommate until Season 2. He gets along tremendously with the kids and opens up his own restaurant. Despite hiding it, he is desperately still in love with Ava.
 Susannah Rexford (Merrin Dungey) is Ava's best friend, business partner and roommate.
 Jay Robertson (Ryan Kwanten) is an Australian, who lives with Ava in Playa Linda and is the "big brother" to the children. He was dating Erika, despite his notorious behavior for being a playboy.
 Bradin Westerly (Jesse McCartney) is the oldest of the three children. He copes with the loss of his parents by drinking, getting involved in drugs and earns a reputation as a wild child. He is also an exceptional surfer and is offered a sponsorship by many major companies but his personal problems seem to get in the way on more than one occasion. 
 Erika Spalding (Taylor Cole) is Jay's girlfriend. She helps coach Bradin with his surfing. She leaves to take care of her mother, but returns and begins dating Bradin.
 Nicole "Nikki" Westerly (Kay Panabaker) is an exceptionally bright child. She starts off trying to take over the "mother" role, but eventually settling in and making many friends including Cameron, who would later become her on/off boyfriend. 
 Derrick Westerly (Nick Benson) is the youngest child. Despite being very close to his Aunt Ava, he can't quite get over the loss of his parents at such a young age.
 Cameron Bale (Zac Efron) is Nikki's best friend and on/off boyfriend. He lives with his troubled, divorced, alcoholic father (portrayed by C. Thomas Howell). In season two, Efron became a part of the main cast after appearing as a recurring star in season one.

Recurring
 Sarah Borden (Sara Paxton) is a troubled teen with an addiction to pot, and problems with pathological lying. She becomes Bradin's girlfriend and pressures him into using drugs and having sex. Sarah's parents eventually send her to rehab. 
 Mona (Carmen Electra) is Johnny's partner, who invests in a bar with him and eventually asks him to move in with her. However, in a tragic automobile accident Mona is killed leaving Johnny heartbroken. He changes the name of his bar to "Mona's Sandbar" in memory of Mona who transferred her share of the property to Johnny before she died. 
 Callie (Danielle Savre) is a girl from the Midwest who becomes one of Bradin's girlfriends and helps him recover from his relationship with Sarah.
 Amber (Shelley Buckner) is Nikki's best friend, Carrie's ex-best friend, and Cameron's ex-girlfriend. Amber and Nikki didn't get along at first, but eventually they put their differences aside and become friends. Amber was once the most popular girl in school. 
 Chris (Tyler Patrick Jones and Cole Petersen), is Derrick's best friend and often plays with Bradin, too.
 Simon O' Keefe (Jay Harrington) is Nikki's principal at Playa Linda Middle School. He and Ava go on their first date after meeting each other at Nikki's school and soon they fall deeply in love with each other. In the season 1 finale, Ava asks Simon to marry her, but in season 2 Simon calls off the wedding because he knows that Ava and Johnny still have deep feelings for each other.
 Carrie (Logan Browning) is Amber's ex-best friend. She is particularly mean to Nikki even after her and Amber become friends and often causes Nikki to be in embarrassing situations. Carrie is jealous of Nikki's friendship with Amber. She appears in Season 2 running for Class President against Cameron.

Production

Music
Each episode of the show features a number of songs from various artists in addition to an original score. The music is usually used as a background element and is non-diegetic, although occasionally the music comes from a diegetic source. In the second-season episode "Where There's a Will, There's a Wave" Christy Carlson Romano stars as a fictional pop star and performs her song "Dive In".

Other artists heard in the show include The Beach Boys, The Penguins, Howie Day, John Mayer, Ryan Adams, Blink-182, Maroon 5, and Lifehouse.

Soundtrack

On March 19, 2005, a soundtrack was released featuring music from both seasons of the show. It included the opening theme as well as a song by cast member Jesse McCartney, "Get Your Shine On", which also appeared on his first album and was released as a single.

Track listing
 "Undertow" – Bowling For Soup
 "General Attitude" – Collective Soul
 "All Downhill from Here" – New Found Glory
 "Get Your Shine On" – Jesse McCartney
 "Feel So Free" – Ivy
 "The Crying" – Kristian Leontiou
 "My Paper Heart" – The All-American Rejects
 "Struggle" – Ringside
 "Try" – Lisa Loeb
 "Alive" – Kenny Wayne Shepherd
 "My Way Home" – Citizen Cope
 "Beautiful Day" – Steve Plunkett

Episodes

Season 1 (2004)

Season 2 (2005)

Broadcast history

Cancellation
On May 15, 2005, The WB released early information on their 2005–2006 season. Summerland, along with eight other shows, were canceled. Jesse McCartney responded to the cancellation in an interview, saying the show was "in a crazy time slot and … the writers were having trouble, and it was just a bad call."

Syndication
The series has been syndicated on The N and Universal HD in the United States. It also aired overseas on Ten Network in Australia, Living in the United Kingdom and Ireland, TV2 in Norway, M6 in France, and on MBC 4 in the Middle East. In Spain, Summerland (which retains its English language title) has been used as a filler during the summer months. In July 2008, Telecinco aired all of the episodes again in the 9 a.m. time slot, the same time slot in which it aired in the summer of 2007. It also used to air in 2013 on Sweden's channel 5, kanal5, however only on weekend mornings.

Awards and nominations

References

External links

  (archived)
 

2000s American teen drama television series
2004 American television series debuts
2005 American television series endings
English-language television shows
Television series about teenagers
Television series by CBS Studios
Television series by Spelling Television
Television shows set in Los Angeles County, California
The WB original programming